Tito Perdue (born 1938) is an American writer. His works include his 1991 debut novel Lee.

Life
Perdue was born in Chile to American parents. He was brought up in Anniston, Alabama. He married his wife Judy when he was 18. He has degrees in English literature, European history and library science. He has worked as a bookkeeper, a library administrator and an apprentice insurance underwriter throughout the Midwest and Northeast, before he moved back to the South in 1982 to pursue a career as a full-time writer.

Work
Perdue's Sweet-Scented Manuscript was completed within a year of his "retirement," but was not published until 2004 when it was issued by Baskerville Pres).  The novel is a love story that attempts to convey the impressions and yearnings of an 18-year-old boy, Leland Pefley, in his first exploration of the world; the novel is largely autobiographical.  Perdue's next novel, Lee, was about the same Leland Pefley, now an old man, bitter, hostile, angry at a world that no longer recognized the values and culture of the 1950s.  He spewed venom at those who, surrounded by beauty, culture and literature, didn't bother to avail themselves of it.  Other works include The Node, Fields of Asphodel and The New Austerities, which depicts Lee Pefley's flight from New York City back to his ancestral home in Alabama.  That same year, Baskerville Press published Perdue's Opportunities in Alabama Agriculture, a strange fictional account of an Alabama man, school teacher, rural route mail carrier, and farmer.

In the pages of Kirkus Reviews it was said Perdue "writes convincingly and iconoclastically… a marvelous black comedy that is sometimes as astringent as John Yount's Toots in Solitude…"

Political opinions
Perdue is a member of the League of the South.

Publications
Lee – Four Walls Eight Windows, 1991; repr. Overlook Press, 2007. .
The New Austerities – Peachtree Press, 1994. .
Opportunities in Alabama Agriculture – Baskerville Press, 1994. .
The Sweet-Scented Manuscript – Baskerville Press, 2004. .
Fields of Asphodel – Overlook Press, 2007. .
The Node – Nine-Banded Books, 2011. .
Morning Crafts – Arktos, 2013. .

References

External links
Official Website

1938 births
20th-century American novelists
21st-century American novelists
American male novelists
American expatriates in Chile
Living people
Novelists from Alabama
People from Cachapoal Province
Writers of American Southern literature
20th-century American male writers
21st-century American male writers